The Alloa Waggonway, also known as the Alloa Railway was an early tramway. It was  miles long and connected coal pits above Alloa with the harbour and a bottle manufacturer at Alloa in Clackmannanshire,  Scotland. The track was wooden with an iron running surface, and wagons were drawn by horses.

History 
 
The Earls of Mar owned extensive lands in the hinterland of Alloa, and for some centuries coal had been produced from pits on the estate. Edinburgh was the biggest market for coal in the area, and it could easily be carried along the Forth by boat, but getting the mineral to the shore of the Forth was the problem.

John, 7th Earl of Mar opened a railway in about 1768 that ran from Alloa Harbour and up through Sauchie, serving the colliery there, to Devon Colliery north of Fishcross.

It was a close copy of the Tranent to Cockenzie Waggonway in gauge, wagon size and operating practices. There were several branches and the system became extensive, there were branches to Collyland (this branch required an inclined plane) and to Sherriffyards Colliery at Gartmorn Dam. By 1806 the system was extended to Tillicoultry, and an alternative route to the Forth at Kennetpans (Clackmannan) Pier was opened.

A useful contemporary commentary about the wagon way is provided by Sinclair (1793).

Coal mining 
Ultimately the waggon way linked the mines to each other, and provided connections to the standard gauge railways in Alloa, the Devon Valley, Tillicoultry as well as the harbour, Devon Iron Works and a bottle manufactory

The line was used to gather coal from pits in and near Sauchie for delivery to industry in Alloa and to the harbour for export. In 1879, 159,699 tons were shipped to foreign countries and 15,392 to UK ports.

Closure 
The Alloa Waggonway lost its importance with the opening of the Tillicoultry Branch of the Stirling & Dunfermline Railway in 1851 but continued for many years until closed in 1924.

The line today 

Today the line has been converted into a cyclepath running from Castle Street, through the earliest railway tunnel in Scotland which passes under Bedford Place, to near Alloa railway station and along the north side of Gartmorn Dam.

References

Bibliography

External links
The Alloa Waggonway

Railway lines opened in 1768
1768 establishments in Scotland
Transport in Clackmannanshire
History of Clackmannanshire
Companies established in 1768
Closed railway lines in Scotland
Horse-drawn railways
Railway lines closed in 1924
Alloa